Mona J. Denton (January 1, 1922 – September 2, 1995) was a right handed pitcher who played in the All-American Girls Professional Baseball League. She was born in Englewood, Colorado.

Mona Denton found limited success in the league as she posted one of the worst career pitching records during her two seasons in the circuit. Nevertheless, neither team she played with gave her much run support and a consistent defense.

Denton entered the league in 1946 with the South Bend Blue Sox, pitching for them in three games before joining the Kenosha Comets in 1947. She only collected one win against 11 losses, which was not necessarily reflected in her solid 3.54 ERA in 26 pitching appearances.

She eventually left the league, and little is known of her afterward.

Denton received further recognition when she became part of Women in Baseball, a permanent display based at the Baseball Hall of Fame and Museum in Cooperstown, New York, which was unveiled in 1988 to honor the entire All-American Girls Professional Baseball League.

Career statistics
Pitching

Batting 

Fielding

References

All-American Girls Professional Baseball League players
South Bend Blue Sox players
Kenosha Comets players
Baseball players from Denver
Date of birth unknown
1922 births
1995 deaths
20th-century American women